Nasuni is a privately-held hybrid cloud storage company with headquarters in Boston, Massachusetts.

History 
Nasuni was founded in 2008, and has raised approximately $169M, with the last funding a $25M investment in which all previous investors participated, including Goldman Sachs, Telstra Ventures, and Northbridge Venture Partners.

In the time since Nasuni requested a patent on UniFS in November 2013, the company has expanded its access to cloud storage infrastructure, as well as its on-premises edge appliance offerings, which provide local access to content stored in Nasuni-managed cloud storage.

On 14 July 2020, Nasuni Corp. collected $25 million in a new round of funding, plus an additional $15 million debt facility, and upgraded its cloud file storage platform to support remote workers.

In May 2022, Nasuni acquired the technology assets of DBM Cloud Systems in order to provide enhanced data migration and cloud portability features.

In June of 2022, Nasuni acquired Storage Made Easy, a file data management company, for an undisclosed sum.

Technology

The firm's storage software uses object storage, file caching appliances, and the company's proprietary UniFS global file system to offer a cloud solution that replaces traditional file servers and Network Attached Storage (NAS). Nasuni integrates with public cloud storage platforms, such as Google Cloud Storage, Amazon Web Services, and Microsoft Azure, and private cloud storage platforms such as IBM Cloud Object Storage and EMC Elastic Cloud Storage (ECS). Such storage platforms provide an object-based storage infrastructure, on top of which UniFS creates a complete versioned file system. The Nasuni platform stores customer data as a sequence of snapshots that include every version of every file. The firm  has demonstrated the ability to store more than one billion objects in a single storage volume.

Nasuni Edge Appliances run in the public cloud or on-premises to provide shared access to cached copies of active files. These Appliances are typically deployed as virtual machines, running on existing infrastructure, including VMware, Nutanix hyper-converged infrastructure, and Microsoft Hyper-V. The Edge Appliances can also run in the cloud on Microsoft Azure, Amazon EC2, or Google Cloud Platform. Hardware appliance choices offered by Nasuni include systems with solid-state drives.

Features

Nasuni’s File Data Platform provides a variety of services, including the following:
 Multi-site collaboration that enables multiple users in multiple locations to work on the same files. 
 Global file lock to ensure that only one user is changing a file at a time. 
 Global file acceleration that optimizes the distribution of files to users. 
 Access Anywhere to enable users to access the files they need from any location. 
 Rapid recovery from ransomware attacks.  
 Professional services to assist with migrating data to cloud storage.

Patents

Nasuni holds a number of patents for technologies that support the Nasuni enterprise file services platform, including:
 Method and system for interfacing to cloud storage.
 Versioned file system with pruning
 Versioned file system with sharing.
 Versioned file system with fast restore.
 Cloud-native global file system with multi-site support using push classes.
 Network accessible file server.
 Versioned file system with global lock.
 Systems and methods for restoring an interface to a global file system.
 Versioned file system using structured data representations.
 Cloud-native global file system with constant-time rekeying.
 Cloud-native global file system with reshapable caching.

Awards
Nasuni has earned several awards for technology and customer service, including the following:
 NorthFace ScoreBoard Award for Customer Service, by the Customer Relationship Management Institute LLC.
 Silver Product of the Year Award for Cloud Storage, by Storage magazine and SearchStorage.
 SIIA Software CODiE Award for Best Cloud Infrastructure, by SIIA Software .

Origin of "Nasuni"
The company name "NASUNI" is shorthand for Andres Rodriguez's original idea for the company: "NAS UNIfied".

References

External links
 Nasuni Official Website

Cloud storage gateways
Technology companies of the United States
Privately held companies of the United States
Cloud storage
Network-attached storage
Privately held companies based in Massachusetts